Events from the year 1106 in Ireland.

Incumbents
High King of Ireland: Domnall Ua Lochlainn

Events
Turlough O’Connor becomes King of Connacht and claimant to the High Kingship of Ireland, reigning until 1156.

Deaths
Máel Muire mac Céilechair, cleric and scribe at the monastery of Clonmacnoise.

References